Massingir Dam is a dam on the Rio dos Elefantes (Olifants or Lepelle), Gaza Province, Mozambique. It is named after the town of Massingir, in Massingir District.

History
By 1975, before the dam's completion, Mozambique gained independence and construction came to a halt. Shortly thereafter the FRELIMO government restarted the project, but by the early 1980s economic decline and war time conditions halted further progress. A failure to maintain dam infrastructure or invest further in completion resulted in the Massingir dam not fulfilling its original purpose and full potential in the irrigation schemes of the Limpopo Valley downstream at Chokwe.

During the period of post conflict reconstruction that followed conclusion to the civil war in 1994 a rehabilitation programme costing US$61m was undertaken, concluding in 2007. Further works now in course involve construction of a new spill-way and installation of a  hydro-electric power plant.

The Massingir Dam is located within Limpopo National Park, forming part of the Great Limpopo Transfrontier Park. The area is an important breeding ground for the Nile Crocodile and there was concern at the Kruger National Park regarding the flooding of the Olifants River Gorge.

See also 

List of dams and reservoirs

References

External links
Wikimapia - Massingir Dam

Dams completed in 2006
Dams in Mozambique
Hydroelectric power stations in Mozambique
Olifants River (Limpopo)
Buildings and structures in Gaza Province